Naima Bakkal (born 28 August 1990) is a Moroccan taekwondo athlete.

She represented Morocco at the 2016 Summer Olympics in Rio de Janeiro, in the women's 57 kg.

References

External links
 

1990 births
Living people
Moroccan female taekwondo practitioners
Olympic taekwondo practitioners of Morocco
Taekwondo practitioners at the 2016 Summer Olympics
20th-century Moroccan women
21st-century Moroccan women